
Year 79 BC was a year of the pre-Julian Roman calendar. At the time it was known as the Year of the Consulship of Vatia Isauricus and Claudius Pulcher (or, less frequently, year 675 Ab urbe condita). The denomination 79 BC for this year has been used since the early medieval period, when the Anno Domini calendar era became the prevalent method in Europe for naming years.

Events 
 By place 

 Roman republic 
 Sulla renounces his dictatorship.
 Cicero travels to Athens and then to Rhodes to continue his studies of philosophy and oratory.

Births

Deaths

References